The Omaliinae are a subfamily of the Staphylinidae, rove beetles.

Anatomy 
Typical adults are 1.5 to 6 mm long, somewhat broader in shape than are most Staphylinidae, with somewhat longer elytra (without serial punctures), the head with a broad neck, the antennae which are only slightly broader at the apex, and tarsi of five articles. In almost all genera is a pair of ocelli near the base of the head, and in a few, the elytra cover the entire abdomen. The maxillary mala of larvae is strap-shaped, but not as long as in the Proteininae, and the mandible lacks a prostheca.

Ecology
Adults and larvae occur in leaf litter, decaying fruits, moss, and under bark of dead trees. Adults of several species and larvae of a few occur in flowers. Adults and larvae of many genera and species are believed to be predatory (they feed on freshly killed small insects), though a few seem to be phytophagous (they damage flowers) or saprophagous (they feed on decaying fruits).

Systematics and evolution
The Omaliinae subfamily is large (comprising over 100 genera), and is divided into these seven tribes:
Anthophagini
Omaliini
Eusphalerini
Hadrognathini
Corneolabiini
Coryphiini
Aphaenostemmini

In North America, 55 genera and more than 200 species are found.

References

External links

Omaliinae at Bugguide.net. 

 
Beetle subfamilies